The  898th Helicopter Reconnaissance and Liaison Squadron (Serbo-Croatian: 898. helikopterska eskadrila za izviđanje i vezu / 898. хеликоптерска ескадрила за извиђање и везу) was an aviation squadron of Yugoslav Air Force formed in 1981 at Golubovci air base 898th Helicopter Flight (Serbo-Croatian: 898. helikoptersko odeljenje / 898. хеликоптерско одељење).

The helicopter flight was formed by order from August 18, 1981, for with 2nd Independent Corps of Yugoslav People's Army for reconnaissance and liaison duties equipped with domestic made Soko SA,341 Gazelle helicopters. By order from March 1, 1985, it is designated as 898th Helicopter Reconnaissance and Liaison Squadron. Due to the 1988 reorganization of field armies of Yugoslav People's Army, 898th Squadron has been attached to 891st Helicopter Reconnaissance and Liaison Squadron as its helicopter flight.

Assignments
2nd Independent Corps (1981–1988)

Previous designations
898th Helicopter Flight (1981-1985)
898th Helicopter Reconnaissance and Liaison Squadron (1985-1988)

Equipment
Soko SA.341 Gazelle Hera (1981–1988)

References

Yugoslav Air Force squadrons
Military units and formations established in 1981